John Fitzgerald (March 17, 1873 – April 19, 1948) was a private serving in the United States Marine Corps during the Spanish–American War who received the Medal of Honor for bravery.

Biography
Fitzgerald was born on March 17, 1873, in Limerick, Ireland. He joined the Marine Corps in December 1894, and was honorably discharged in February 1905.

Fitzgerald died on April 19, 1948, was buried at Holy Cross Cemetery in Brooklyn, New York.

Medal of Honor citation
Rank and organization: Private, U.S. Marine Corps. Born: 17 March 1873, Limerick, Ireland. Accredited to: New York. G.O. No.: 92, 8 December 1910.

Citation:

For heroism and gallantry in action at Cuzco, Cuba, 14 June 1898.

See also

List of Medal of Honor recipients for the Spanish–American War

References

External links

1873 births
1948 deaths
19th-century Irish people
United States Marine Corps Medal of Honor recipients
United States Marines
American military personnel of the Spanish–American War
Irish-born Medal of Honor recipients
Irish emigrants to the United States (before 1923)
Military personnel from Limerick (city)
Spanish–American War recipients of the Medal of Honor